Non nobis laboramus (Latin for "we labor not for ourselves") is the motto of the Vermont Historical Society, the Vermont Medical Society, and the Liverpool Medical Students Society, which is part of the University of Liverpool, a red brick university in the United Kingdom.

References

External links
 Rugg, M.D.,  D.F. "Vice President's Address to the Vermont Medical Society." Transactions of the Vermont Medical Society for the Year 1877. 
 Vermont History: The Proceedings of the Vermont Historical Society. Volume XXX, Number 4. October 1962.

Latin mottos
History of Vermont